Ivan Vladimirovich Alypov (Russian: Иван Владимирович Алыпов; born 19 April 1982) is a Russian cross-country skier who has competed since 2002. He won the bronze medal in the Team Sprint event at the 2006 Winter Olympics at Turin.

Alypov's best finish at the Nordic skiing World Championships was 34th in the Sprint event in 2005. He won a 30 km event in Italy in 2003 and is Russian national champion at 50 km in 2006.

Cross-country skiing results
All results are sourced from the International Ski Federation (FIS).

Olympic Games
 1 medal – (1 bronze)

World Championships

World Cup

Individual podiums
2 podiums – (1 , 1 )

Team podiums
 1 victory – (1 )
 3 podiums – (1 , 2 )

References

External links

Russian male cross-country skiers
1982 births
Living people
Cross-country skiers at the 2006 Winter Olympics
Olympic bronze medalists for Russia
Olympic cross-country skiers of Russia
Olympic medalists in cross-country skiing
Medalists at the 2006 Winter Olympics
Universiade medalists in cross-country skiing
Universiade gold medalists for Russia
Competitors at the 2003 Winter Universiade